Philipp Hoffmann (23 November 1806 – 3 January 1889) was a German architect and builder, principally known for his work in the Nassau capital in Wiesbaden.

Life
Hoffmann was born in Geisenheim. In 1830 he was a building assessor in the Nassau Civil Service. As a young architect, his first design for the Neo-Gothic expansion of the Rheingauer Dom in his birthplace of Geisenheim (1834-1838), followed by involvement in the design of the Stadtschloss in Wiesbaden (1837-1841) - he was sent to Pompeii for six months by his architect Georg Moller, where he drew Roman paintings later used as the basis for the Stadtschloss's interior.

These projects gained the attention of William, Duke of Nassau, who promoted him to court architect of Nassau in 1850. In that role he designed several buildings in Wiesbaden, including St. Bonifatius (1844-1849), the Russian Orthodox Church on the Neroberg (1847-1855), the Monopteros (1863-1869, also on the Neroberg) and the Ministerialgebäude which house the Hessian Ministry of Justice (1854). These were followed by the Michelsberg synagogue (1863-1869), the Waterloo Monument on the Luisenplatz (1865) and the Kaiser-Wilhelms-Heilanstalt (1868-1871, now connected to the Stadtschloss).

Outside Wiesbaden, he also designed two buildings in Bad Schwalbach – the Anglican Church for English visitors (1874) and the baths (1879).

Hoffmann died, aged 82, in San Remo.

Gallery

Sources

 
  Manfred Laufs (ed.): Philipp Hoffmann (1806–1889). [Arbeitshefte des Landesamtes für Denkmalpflege Hessen, Band 12.] Theiss, Stuttgart 2007, 

1806 births
1889 deaths
19th-century German architects